Admiral of the Fleet Matthew Aylmer, 1st Baron Aylmer (ca. 1650 – 18 August 1720), of Covent Garden, Westminster, and Westcliffe, near Dover, was an Anglo-Irish Royal Navy officer and Whig politician who sat in the English and British House of Commons between 1695 and 1720.

Aylmer was one of the captains who sent a letter to Prince William of Orange, who had just landed at Torbay, assuring the Prince of the captains' support; the Prince's response ultimately led to the Royal Navy switching allegiance to the Prince and the Glorious Revolution of November 1688.

Aylmer saw action at the Battle of Bantry Bay in May 1689, at the Battle of Beachy Head in July 1690 and again at the Battle of Barfleur in May 1692 during the Nine Years' War.

Aylmer became Commander-in-Chief of the Navy on 12 November 1709. However, when Aylmer met a French squadron and convoy, he was only able to capture one merchantman and the 56-gun Superbe: the new Harley Ministry used this failure as an excuse to remove him as Commander-in-Chief and did so a few months later. Following the accession of George I and the appointment of the Townshend Ministry, Aylmer was reappointed Commander-in-Chief on 5 November 1714. He was also appointed Governor of Greenwich Hospital: in this post, he founded the Royal Hospital School for the sons of seamen.

Early career

Aylmer was the second son of Sir Christopher Aylmer of Balrath, County Meath, and Margaret Aylmer (née Plunkett), daughter of Matthew Plunkett, 5th Baron Louth and Mary Fitzwilliam. He served briefly in the Army as Ensign of foot in the Duke of Buckingham's regiment from 1672 and then joined the Royal Navy as a midshipman in the galley HMS Charles in October 1677 before being promoted to lieutenant in April 1678. Promoted to commander on 19 January 1679, he became commanding officer of the sloop HMS Chatham and then transferred to the command of the prize ship HMS Date Tree in Summer 1679. He transferred again to the command of the fire ship HMS Castle in the Mediterranean Fleet later in the year, to the command of the fifth-rate HMS Swann on the Coast of Ireland in July 1680 and to the command of the fourth-rate HMS Tiger in the Mediterranean Fleet in January 1682, before becoming commanding officer of the galley HMS Charles in September 1685. Aylmer was a young officer of the "courtier type" who benefited from the patronage of the Duke of Buckingham.

Promoted to captain on 1 October 1688, Aylmer was given command of the fourth-rate HMS Swallow in the Thames; he was one of the captains who sent a letter to Prince William of Orange, who had just landed at Torbay, assuring the Prince of the captains' support. Indeed, he was perhaps the chief of the cabal. Aylmer followed up the letter with a visit to the Prince's headquarters and arranged that Lieutenant George Byng and Captain Anthony Hastings should accompany him during the visit. The Prince's warm response to the captains ultimately led to the Royal Navy switching allegiance to the Prince and the Glorious Revolution of November 1688.

Aylmer transferred to the command of the third-rate HMS Mary in December 1688 and was present at the French victory at the Battle of Bantry Bay in May 1689 at an early stage of the Nine Years' War. His brother George Aylmer was killed during the battle.

Aylmer transferred again, this time to the command of the second-rate HMS Royal Katherine in Spring 1690 and was present at the French victory at Battle of Beachy Head in July 1690. He transferred to the command of the third-rate HMS Monck in the North Sea in Summer 1691 and then took command of the first-rate HMS London in Spring 1692. As Second Captain to Admiral Edward Russell, he saw action again at the tactically indecisive Battle of Barfleur in May 1692. As a captain, Aylmer was quite deferential to his Spanish partners during the War. Samuel Pepys believed that Aylmer should have been hanged for his habit of dipping his colours to Spanish Admirals.

Senior command

Promoted to rear admiral on 8 February 1693 and to vice admiral in June 1693, Aylmer hoisted his flag in the first-rate HMS Royal Sovereign and served under Admiral Edward Russell as second-in-command of the Mediterranean Fleet. He also became Whig Member of Parliament for Portsmouth at a by-election in 1695 but had to stand down when the House of Commons declared the by-election void in January 1696. Nevertheless, he was elected Whig Member of Parliament for Dover in December 1697. The Treaty of Ryswick was signed in September 1697, bringing the Nine Years' War to an end and, after a delay in fitting out his squadron, Aylmer went out into the Mediterranean, with his flag in the second-rate HMS Boyne, to ensure the treaty was being observed in September 1698; he then retired from active service in October 1699. In around 1700 he acquired Wallett's Court Manor at Westcliffe in Kent as a property in which he would live in retirement. He also had a property at No. 12 Great Piazza in Covent Garden.

Following the death of Prince George (Queen Anne's consort), which brought Russell back to the Admiralty, Aylmer was promoted to Admiral of the Fleet and Commander-in-Chief of the Navy on 12 November 1709. He lost his Dover seat at the 1710 British general election which produced a landslide victory for the Tory party in the wake of the prosecution of Henry Sacheverell which Aylmer had supported. In July 1710, when Aylmer met a French squadron and convoy, he was only able to capture one merchantman and the 56-gun Superbe: the new Harley Ministry used this failure as an excuse to remove him as Commander-in-Chief and did so in January 1711.

Following the accession of George I in August 1714, which led to the appointment of the Townshend Ministry in September 1714, Russell was back at the Admiralty again and Aylmer was reappointed Commander-in-Chief on 5 November 1714. Alymer was also appointed Governor of Greenwich Hospital on the same date: in this post he started to fund education for the sons of seamen from entry charges to the Painted Hall, pensioners' fines and proceeds from the sale of stores. The same day he was also appointed Ranger of Greenwich Park.

Alymer recovered his seat in Parliament at Dover at the 1715 British general election which saw the Whigs win an overwhelming majority in the House of Commons. He went on to join the Board of Admiralty led by the Earl of Berkeley, as Senior Naval Lord, in April 1717. He resigned his appointments as a member of the Admiralty Board and as Commander-in-Chief in March 1718 and was rewarded by being appointed Rear-Admiral of Great Britain and also being created Lord Aylmer of Balrath in the Peerage of Ireland on 1 May 1718.

Aylmer died at Queen's House in Greenwich on 18 August 1720 and was buried at St Alfege's Church in Greenwich.

Family
In circa 1680 Aylmer married Sarah, daughter of Edward Ellis; they had a son and two daughters.

References

Sources

Further reading

External links
 
Matthew Aylmer, 1st Baron Aylmer Three Decks

|-

|-

|-

Irish sailors in the Royal Navy
1650s births
1720 deaths
17th-century Irish people
18th-century Irish people
Irish sailors
Royal Navy admirals of the fleet
17th-century Royal Navy personnel
People from County Meath
Irish expatriates in England
Barons Aylmer
Peers of Ireland created by George I
Younger sons of baronets
English MPs 1695–1698
English MPs 1698–1700
Members of the Parliament of Great Britain for Dover
British MPs 1707–1708
British MPs 1708–1710
British MPs 1715–1722
Lords of the Admiralty